Harold Kauffman (December 20, 1875 – December 9, 1936) was an American tennis player. He competed in the men's doubles event at the 1904 Summer Olympics.

References

External links
 

1875 births
1936 deaths
American male tennis players
Olympic tennis players of the United States
Tennis players at the 1904 Summer Olympics
Tennis players from St. Louis